Batiae or Batiai, also known as Bitia (Βιτία), was an ancient Greek city located in the region of Epirus. It was located in Thesprotia, mentioned along with Elateia, and situated in the interior in the neighbourhood of Pandosia. The city-site is located near modern Kastri, Thesprotiko, Lelovo.

See also
List of cities in ancient Epirus

References

Citations

Sources

Populated places in ancient Epirus
Cities in ancient Epirus
Former populated places in Greece
Elean colonies